The 1903–04 Rugby Union County Championship was the 16th edition of England's premier rugby union club competition at the time.   
Kent won the competition for the second time defeating Durham in the final.

Final

See also
 English rugby union system
 Rugby union in England

References

Rugby Union County Championship
County Championship (rugby union) seasons